Stéphane Derenoncourt is a French vigneron working as a consultant for numerous estates in Bordeaux and other wine producers worldwide. With his wife, Christine Derenoncourt, he runs Vignerons Consultants and owns Domaine de l'A in the Côtes de Castillon and Derenoncourt California in Napa Valley. He is entirely self-taught.

Biography
Derenoncourt was born in Dunkirk in 1963. The start of his career in viticulture began when he arrived as a hitch-hiker in Fronsac in 1982, and worked several harvests before he found employment at Château Fronsac in 1985. After two years working at various vineyards, he began working in the cellar at Château La Fleur Cailleau. In 1990, Derenoncourt was offered a position at the Corre-Macquin family’s cellar at the Château Pavie-Macquin vineyard, and in 1996 was hired as a winemaker by Stephan von Neipperg to his estates, including Château Canon-la-Gaffelière and the "super cuvée" La Mondotte.

Consultant work
Derenoncourt began as a consultant in 1997, and in 1999 he and his wife started their own consultancy company, Vignerons Consultants. In 2010, Stéphane Derenoncourt, Julien Lavenu, Simon Blanchard and Frédéric Massie are associates and the consultancy becomes Derenoncourt Consultants. Derenoncourt and his team now works with a populous portfolio of estates in Bordeaux and elsewhere, including Domaine de Chevalier, Clos Fourtet, Clos de l'Oratoire and Chateaux Pavie-Macquin, Chateau Malescasse, Canon-la-Gaffelière, La Gaffelière, Petit Village, Smith Haut Lafitte, Brown, Les Carmes Haut-Brion, Rol Valentin, Prieuré-Lichine and Beauséjour Duffau-Lagarrosse. In June 2008, Derenoncourt and Vignerons Consultants was hired by Francis Ford Coppola to work on the Napa Valley property Rubicon Estate Winery. Other Derenoncourt projects abroad include engagements in Italy, Austria, Spain, Turkey, in Syria with Domaine de Bargylus, and in Beqaa Valley, Lebanon with Château Marsyas.

Winery estates and wines
Derenoncourt and his wife owns the estate Domaine de l'A, in the Bordeaux sub-region Côtes de Castillon, and with the wine merchant François Thienpont, the negociant company  Terra Burdigala, with an aim to provide a distribution outlet for quality estates in less glamorous and publicly profiled areas and regions. Derenoncourt has also been a member of the Montesquieu Wines buying team since 2006, selecting wines Montesquieu offers its clients.

In late 2009, Derenoncourt released his first California wine, Derenoncourt California, a project started in 2006. The 2006 vintage of Derenoncourt California features five single-vineyard wines: a Napa Valley Cabernet Sauvignon from Caldwell Vineyard, a Napa Valley Cabernet Franc from Caldwell Vineyard, a Napa Valley Merlot from Stagecoach Vineyard, a Napa Valley Syrah from Carneros, and a Lake County Cabernet Sauvignon from Red Hills Vineyard. The wines are produced at Arkenstone Vineyards on Howell Mountain. His inaugural U.S. wines received positive reviews from James Laube of the Wine Spectator, Joshua Greene of Wine & Spirits, and L. Pierce Carson of the Napa Valley Register, among others.

See also
French wine
List of wine personalities

References

External links
 Derenoncourt Consultants 
 Derenoncourt California

1963 births
Living people
People from Dunkirk
French winemakers